is a Prefectural Natural Park in Wakayama Prefecture, Japan. Established in 1968, the park spans the borders of the municipalities of Hashimoto, Katsuragi, Kōya, and Kudoyama.

See also
 National Parks of Japan
 Sacred Sites and Pilgrimage Routes in the Kii Mountain Range
 List of Historic Sites of Japan (Wakayama)
 List of Places of Scenic Beauty of Japan (Wakayama)

References

External links
  Maps of Kōyasanchō Ishimichi-Tamagawakyō Prefectural Natural Park

Parks and gardens in Wakayama Prefecture
Hashimoto, Wakayama
Katsuragi, Wakayama
Kōya, Wakayama
Kudoyama, Wakayama
Protected areas established in 1968
1968 establishments in Japan